William James Chidley (c.1860 – 21 December 1916) was an Australian philosopher with unconventional theories on sex, diet and clothing.

Early life
Chidley was born in Melbourne around 1860 and was adopted by John James Chidley, a toymaker and his first wife Maria, née Lancelott. His adoptive parents were followers of the teachings of Swedish philosopher Emanuel Swedenborg. Chidley attended several different schools in Melbourne, leaving school at the age of 13 and continuing his education by reading in public libraries.

Career
Chidley was apprenticed first to a solicitor and then to an architect, unsuccessfully.  He began working for his adoptive father where he learned photography and developed a talent for drawing. As a younger man, Chidley supported himself by drawing for medical texts.  This exposed him to various contemporary medical theories about human sexuality and Chidley formed the conviction that "there was something profoundly wrong with the way in which modern people had sex". He believed he had made an important scientific discovery that the human race had been living in error.

In 1911, Chidley published The Answer in Melbourne. The authorities attempted to prevent distribution by prosecuting booksellers and Chidley on the grounds that the pamphlet contained material "which would tend to deprave and corrupt the morals of any person reading it."  Chidley sold copies to curious passers-by on the footpath. In 1912, Chidley moved to Sydney, where he became a familiar bearded figure dressed in a Grecian-style tunic and sandals, giving public lectures and wandering the streets, carrying a bundle of his pamphlets. He preached the "Answer" to living a natural life to Sydneysiders.  "Do nothing which is unnatural however slight" was his precept.  He believed people should return to nudity, natural coition and a diet comprising only fruit and nuts to "be at one with Nature and one another". Chidley suffered constant persecution by the authorities, was committed to various asylums and even jailed. Regarded as a pervert, because he dared to mention sex in a repressed society, he was on the contrary something of a puritan in his teachings and lifestyle. In 1912 the courts imposed fines on booksellers who stocked "The Answer", and in 1914 the Supreme Court suppressed the publication.

Chidley was charged with offensive behaviour, deemed insane by the Lunacy Court on 3 August 1912 and sent to the Callan Park Hospital. His case sparked a lot of public debate about the use of the law to imprison people in asylums and he won a lot of public support, people regarding him as a well meaning eccentric or crank deprived of his liberty and his right to speak freely. In August 1916 Chidley was released from an asylum under conditions that he "not address persons, and particularly women, by circular asking them to grant him interviews, in order that he might explain his theory to them." He was banned from holding meetings in public parks but he was soon addressing Sydney crowds in The Domain. On 16 February 1916 Chidley was again found insane and committed to Kenmore Mental Hospital at Goulburn.

Chidley wrote his autobiography, entitled "Confessions" and sent a copy of the manuscript to Henry Havelock Ellis. In 1935 Ellis sent this manuscript to the Mitchell Library, Sydney, remarking "Not only is it a document of much psychological interest, but as a picture of the intimate aspects of Australian life in the nineteenth century it is of the highest interest, and that value will go on increasing as time passes".

Chidley attempted suicide on 12 October 1916 and later died suddenly on 21 December 1916 of arteriosclerosis, an inmate at Callan Park Hospital for the Insane.

Selected publications

The Answer or the World as Joy: An Essay on Philosophy (1915)
Confessions of William James Chidley (1977)

References

Further reading

External links
 [CC-By-SA]

1860s births
1916 deaths
Australian philosophers
Pseudoscientific diet advocates